Deyang is a prefecture-level city of Sichuan province, China. Deyang is a largely industrial city, with companies such as China National Erzhong Group and Dongfang Electric having major operations there. The city is rich in history, with the Sanxingdui archeological site in Guanghan uncovering a rich trove of bronze and gold masks. More recently, Deyang was greatly afflicted by the 2008 Sichuan earthquake, which particularly impacted its county-level cities of Mianzhu and Shifang, in Deyang's northwest.

History 

The ancient Shu civilization included present-day Deyang, which is home to the Sanxingdui relics.

Deyang was first organized as a county during the Tang dynasty.

Deyang became a prefecture-level city in 1983.

On August 3, 1996, Deyang's Shizhong District was split into Jingyang District and Luojiang County (now Luojiang District).

2008 Earthquake

On May 12, 2008, a magnitude 8.0 earthquake occurred. An estimated 90,000 people were killed or still missing with an estimated 400,000 injured. Around 5 million were effected through property losses, many left homeless. Schools in Mianzhu and Shifang collapsed.

Deyang county has mostly recovered from the devastation of the 2008 earthquake with most people now compensated where required (injuries, etc.) and established in new houses. In some cases they are in new areas, as well as factories and work being re-established. For the new houses, in most cases, the owners are requested to meet 30% of the cost while the government covers the rest. While the government didn't meet its initial (and ambitious) one-year plan to rehouse all victims, it did manage to mostly be successful within two years. In the meantime, residents lived in government-provided mobile home type cities with weekly cash payments for all victims to purchase food and clothing.

Geography 
Deyang is located in the northeastern portion of the Chengdu Plain, with the Longquan Mountains to the east lying in between the city and the larger Sichuan Basin. The river has been widened, five of the bridges are part dams, and it has assumed the name of Jing Lake.

Deyang is located directly north of Chengdu, less than an hour's drive.

Climate 
Deyang experiences a humid subtropical climate, with four distinct seasons. The coldest month in Deyang is January, and the hottest month is July. Most precipitation in Deyang occurs during the summer months. The annual frost-free period in Deyang typically lasts between 270 and 290 days, and snowfall typically only occurs on a handful of days. Deyang experiences its strongest winds from March to May, and its calmest winds typically happen between October and February.

Subdivisions

Demographics

According to the 2020 Chinese census, Deyang has a population of 3,456,161. During the first half of the 2010s, Deyang's population fell by about 100,000 people, although its population had slightly rebounded in the latter half of the 2010s. In the 2000 Chinese Census, Deyang's population totaled 3,615,758, and in the 2000 Chinese Census, its population was 3,788,056.

Throughout the 2010s, Deyang experienced increased urbanization, with its urbanization rate increasing from 41.32% in 2010 to 53.89% in 2019. Deyang has a sex ratio of approximately 103 males per 100 females.

Ethnic groups 
99.24% of the city's population is ethnically Han Chinese, with the remaining 0.76% of the population belonging to 51 officially recognized ethnic minorities. Major ethnic minorities in Deyang include the Hui, Tibetans, the Yi, and the Qiang.

Hui people 
The Hui people are the largest ethnic minority in Deyang.

Economy
As of 2019, Deyang has a gross domestic product (GDP) of 233.591 billion RMB, of which, 23.460 billion RMB comes from the primary sector, 118.439 billion RMB comes from the secondary sector, and 91.692 billion RMB comes from the tertiary sector. Compared to Sichuan as a whole, Deyang is more reliant on its secondary sector, which is responsible for 50.70% of Deyang's total GDP, while making up 37.25% of Sichuan's GDP. In 2019, Deyang's annual GDP growth was 7.2%, slightly below Sichuan's growth rate of 7.5%. GDP per capita growth in Deyang was 6.7% that same year, again slightly below the Sichuan total of 7.0%.

As of 2019, Deyang's gross domestic product per capita totals 65,745 RMB, higher than the Sichuan average of 55,774 RMB. However, the average annual wage in Deyang is 63,585 RMB per year, slightly below the Sichuan average of 69,267 RMB per year. On average, workers in Deyang's urban areas earn 37,222 RMB of disposable income annually, well below the Sichuan average of 45,878 RMB per year. Workers in Deyang's rural areas earn an average of 18,249 RMB in disposable income annually, below the Sichuan average of 24,357 RMB per year. The highest paying industry in Deyang is healthcare and social service, which pays, on average, 101,293 RMB per year, slightly below the Sichuan average of 192,904 RMB per year. The lowest paying industry in Deyang is the agriculture, forestry, and fishing industry, which pays, on average, 28,812 RMB per year, significantly below the Sichuan average of 51,754 RMB per year. 32.1% of Deyang's workforce is employed in the primary sector, 27.7% is employed in the secondary sector, and 40.2% is employed in the tertiary sector. Of Deyang's 2.17 million workers, about 697,500 work in agriculture, forestry, and fishing.

Industry 
Deyang is an important part of Cheng (Chengdu) De (Deyang) Mian (Mianyang) Economic District of the Sichuan province, a base for heavy machinery production in China. Deyang produces large amounts of electrical equipment, including components for nuclear power plants, hydropower plants, steam turbines, and various casts.

In addition, Deyang also has a sizable light industry, in particular, the food industry. A number of brands, such as Jiannan Chunjiu,  Great Wall Cigar, and Bingchuan Shidai Mineral Water. Other major manufacturers include Lan Jian Beer Factory & Shifang Tobacco Company. According to the Deyang city government, Great Wall Cigar's plant in Deyang is the largest cigar factory in all of Asia.

Although Deyang's sizable industry, it is remarkably clean. Air quality is very high, due to breezes coming from the immediate east mountain ranges and large expanse of countryside.

Culture 

Transportation 

Numerous railways run through the city, including the Chengdu–Mianyang–Leshan intercity railway, the Baoji–Chengdu railway, and the Dazhou–Chengdu railway. 

Deyang also has an extensive bus service and taxis.

Tourism 

Other sites include the Huang Jiguang Memorial Hall, honoring Chinese soldier Huang Jiguang. The Longmenshan National Park is also located in Deyang.

Sister cities

Deyang is a sister city with Muncie, Indiana; 
 Vladimir, Russia, since 1994;
 Kreis Siegen-Wittgenstein, Germany, since 1996;
 L'Alcúdia, Spain, since 1997;
 Lahti, Finland, since 2000;

References

 
Prefecture-level divisions of Sichuan
Cities in Sichuan